The discography of Good Riddance, a Santa Cruz, California-based hardcore punk band, consists of nine studio albums, one live album, two compilation albums, eight EPs, one video album, and five music videos.

Good Riddance was founded in 1986 by singer Russ Rankin, but did not coalesce into a functioning band until the addition of guitarist Luke Pabich several years later. With bassist Devin Quinn and drummer Rich McDermott the band released its debut EP, Gidget, in 1993 through Austin, Texas record label Little Deputy Records. Quinn left and was temporarily replaced by Tom Kennedy before Chuck Platt joined as the band's permanent bassist. Good Riddance signed to Fat Wreck Chords, releasing their debut album For God and Country and the Decoy EP in 1995. McDermott then left and was replaced by Sean Sellers for 1996's A Comprehensive Guide to Moderne Rebellion. Using several outtakes from the album sessions, Good Riddance released split EPs with Reliance, Ignite, Ill Repute, and Ensign through other record labels over the following year. Ballads from the Revolution followed in 1998, and Operation Phoenix in 1999.

Sellers left Good Riddance in late 1999, and Dave Raun of Lagwagon played drums on their 2000 EP The Phenomenon of Craving. Dave Wagenschutz of Kid Dynamite joined as the band's new drummer, debuting with them on 2001's Symptoms of a Leveling Spirit. The album marked the band's first appearance on the Billboard charts, reaching no. 32 on the Independent Albums chart. This was followed by the video documentary Exposed! 1994–1999 and a split EP with Kill Your Idols. Cover Ups, a compilation of cover versions from the band's previous releases, was released in 2002 through Lorelei Records, a label co-founded by Rankin. Wagenschutz left Good Riddance  following 2003's Bound by Ties of Blood and Affection, which reached no. 47 on the Independent Albums chart, and the band slipped into a period of inactivity during which Rankin started Only Crime.

Good Riddance returned in 2006 with My Republic, with Sean Sellers back as drummer, but decided in 2007 to break up the band. Their final performance on May 27, 2007 was recorded, and released in 2008 as the live album Remain in Memory: The Final Show. The compilation album Capricorn One: Singles & Rarities was released in 2010, collecting tracks from the band's split releases and several unreleased demos. Good Riddance reunited in 2012 and released their eighth studio album, Peace in Our Time, in 2015, followed in 2019 by Thoughts and Prayers.

Studio albums

Live albums

Compilation albums

Extended plays

Video albums

Music videos

Other appearances 
The following Good Riddance songs were released on compilation albums. Some songs were later re-released on Cover Ups and Capricorn One: Singles & Rarities, as noted below. This is not an exhaustive list; songs that were first released on the band's albums, EPs, or singles are not included.

I Denotes songs that were re-released on Cover Ups.

II Denotes songs that were re-released on Capricorn One: Singles & Rarities.

References

Punk rock group discographies
Discographies of American artists